Granita may refer to:

 Granita, an Italian frozen dessert
 The Granita Pact, or Blair-Brown deal, an alleged agreement in British politics
 The Deal (2003 film), a 2003 film about the alleged deal
 The Granita restaurant, the venue of the alleged Granita Pact
 The Granița River, a tributary of the Neagra Şarului River in Romania.